Madagascar participated at the 2018 Summer Youth Olympics in Buenos Aires, Argentina from 6 October to 18 October 2018.

Competitors

Athletics

Track

Judo

Individual

Team

Weightlifting

Madagascar was given a quota by the tripartite committee to compete in weightlifting.

Boy

Girls

References

2018 in Malagasy sport
Nations at the 2018 Summer Youth Olympics
2018